Queijo de Azeitão is a Portuguese cheese originating from the town of Azeitão, in the municipality of Setúbal. It is produced in Setúbal, Palmela and Sesimbra.

It has been granted PDO status in the European Union.

In 2014, Azeitão cheese was named one of the 50 best gastronomic products in the world by the Great Taste Awards.

See also
 List of cheeses § Portugal
 List of Portuguese cheeses with protected status

References

Portuguese cheeses
Portuguese products with protected designation of origin
Portuguese cuisine
Cheeses with designation of origin protected in the European Union